Billy Lawless (born 4 July 1951) is an Irish former Independent politician and businessman who served as a Senator from 2016 to 2020, after being nominated by the Taoiseach. Lawless is a native of Rahoon, County Galway. In the 1980s, he was Chair of Fine Gael in the Galway West constituency and stood unsuccessfully for Galway City Council in 1991. He emigrated to Chicago in 1998, having always harboured plans to open a business in the U.S. he made the decision after his daughter received a rowing scholarship to Boston University.

He currently owns four restaurants in the Chicago area, employing 260 people, and is a board member and co-founder of the Illinois Business Immigration Coalition (IBIC) and Chair of Chicago Celts for Immigration Reform.

Lawless has been credited with helping the cause of Irish immigrants and undocumented Irish in America, and was made Freeman of Galway in 2015 for these efforts. He was conferred with an Honorary Doctorate by NUI Galway in June 2015. On 11 May 2016, Taoiseach Enda Kenny appointed Lawless to the 25th Seanad, making him the first overseas Irish Senator.

Lawless had close ties to the Obama administration and was chosen to introduce the President when he announced his plans for immigration reform. He was an unsuccessful candidate at the 2021 Seanad by-elections. In 2021, Lawless was awarded the Irish Presidential Distinguished Service Award for Irish Community Support.

References

1951 births
Living people
Businesspeople from Chicago
Independent members of Seanad Éireann
Irish expatriates in the United States
Members of the 25th Seanad
Nominated members of Seanad Éireann
Politicians from Galway (city)